Pets Tseng Pei-tzu (born October 21, 1984) is a Taiwanese singer and actress.

Early life and career 
Born in Taipei, Tseng graduated from National Chung Cheng University with a degree in Business Administration.

In 2007, Tseng competed on the second season of singing competition program One Million Star in which she was placed sixth. She made her television debut in K.O.3an Guo (2009) and in 2012 she starred in drama series KO One Return. In 2014, she signed a recording deal with Linfair Records, and released her debut album, I'm Pets, in the same year. Her second album, I Love You, Period!, was released on July 2, 2017. In 2018, she signed a recording deal with AsiaMuse Entertainment and on August 16, 2019, she released her third studio album, Confession.

Personal life 
In January 2022, Tseng announced her marriage to Peter Sun, the guitarist of a religious band Joshua Band. Tseng and Sun have known each other for more than 10 years and dated for more than one-and-a-half years before marrying.

Discography

Studio albums

Soundtrack albums

Compilation albums

Singles

Filmography

Television series

Film

Variety show

Music video appearances

Published works

Awards and nominations

References

External links

 
 

 

Living people
1984 births
Taiwanese television actresses
Taiwanese Mandopop singers
21st-century Taiwanese actresses
Actresses from Taipei
21st-century Taiwanese singers
Taiwanese television presenters
National Chung Cheng University alumni
21st-century Taiwanese women singers
Taiwanese women television presenters